Erruca cruenta is a moth of the family Erebidae. It was described by Maximilian Perty in 1834. It is found in the Amazon region.

References

Moths described in 1834
Taxa named by Maximilian Perty